Abdellah El Ajri(September 25, 1951 – March 17, 2010) was a Moroccan football player and manager and a handball player.

Career 
Abdellah El Ajri was firstly a handball player before he started playing football. He played for the Morocco national football team, making six appearances, and the Morocco men's national handball team at the same time.

As a football Player, he was illustrated with FUS Rabat especially when he scored two goals in the final of 1973 Moroccan Throne Cup against Ittihad Khemisset (3-2).

As a manager, El Ajri managed several clubs in Morocco and abroad like Raja Casablanca, FUS Rabat and Baniyas SC. He also managed the Morocco national under-20 football team, senior Morocco national football team in 1994 FIFA World Cup and the Morocco local national team in 2008.

On March 17, 2010, El Ajri died in the morning after suffering a heart attack in Rabat. He was age 59.

References

1951 births
2010 deaths
Footballers from Rabat
Moroccan footballers
Morocco international footballers
Moroccan football managers
1994 FIFA World Cup managers
Botola players
Fath Union Sport players
Raja CA managers
Morocco national football team managers
Moroccan male handball players
Association football midfielders
Botola managers